The Communist Party of Palestine was a communist party in Palestine 1922-1923. It was formed through a split in the Po‘alei Tziyon which led to the formation of the Jewish Communist Party and another faction forming the Palestinian Communist Party). A major difference between the two parties was the attitude towards Zionism. The Communist Party of Palestine was more staunch in its condemnation of Zionism, whereas the Palestinian Communist Party was open towards some degree of cooperation with Zionists. The Communist Party of Palestine opposed Zionist settlements in Palestine.

In 1923 the two parties merged, forming the Palestine Communist Party.

References

Political parties established in 1922
Political parties in Mandatory Palestine
Communist parties in Mandatory Palestine
1922 establishments in Mandatory Palestine
Political parties disestablished in 1923
1923 disestablishments in Mandatory Palestine